A. palustris may refer to:

 Aethiothemis palustris, a species of dragonfly in family Libellulidae
 Anacamptis palustris, a species of orchid

See also
 Palustris (disambiguation)